Govt. It is one of the oldest high schools of the district. It is a co-ed Oriya-medium school affiliated to the Board of Secondary Education, Odisha under State Government of Odisha.

History
The 50-year-old high school was established in the year 1959 by Late Biju Patnaik, Ex-Chief Minister of Odisha and hence named after him. The school was a pioneer in the development of education in the undivided koraput district. The school maintains an ECO Club.

See also
Board of Secondary Education, Odisha
List of schools in India

References

High schools and secondary schools in Odisha
Education in Rayagada district
Educational institutions established in 1959
1959 establishments in Orissa